Gudrun Kadereit (born 1969) is a German botanist, the Princess Therese von Bayern Chair of Systematics, Biodiversity and Evolution of Plants at the Ludwig Maximilians University of Munich and the director of both the Botanical Garden Munich-Nymphenburg and the Botanical State Collection Munich.
Her research focuses on angiosperm phylogenetics, systematics and biogeography, in particular on the families Amaranthaceae, Melastomataceae, Crassulaceae, Aizoaceae and Zygophyllaceae but also on the evolution of C4 photosynthesis and Crassulacean Acid Metabolism (CAM) and the evolution of seed traits.

References

External links 
 

1969 births
German botanists
Living people
Academic staff of the Ludwig Maximilian University of Munich